The 2008 All-Ireland Senior Ladies' Football Championship Final featured  and . This was the first of three All-Ireland Ladies' football finals between 2008 and 2013 that saw Cork play Monaghan. They would also play each other in  2011. Cork won a fourth successive All-Ireland title. Valerie Mulcahy scored 3–2, including two penalties, as Cork defeated Monaghan by 14 points. Mulcahy provided the game's opening score, a penalty in the third minute, following Christina Reilly's foul on Mary O'Connor. Although Monaghan would get back to within a point of Cork on three separate occasions, they subsequently trailed all the way to the finish. At half-time, just three points separated the sides, with Cork leading by 1–8 to 0–8. The crucial goal for Cork came five minutes after half-time, when Mulcahy palmed home a disputed second goal to open up a 2–8 to 0–8 lead. Any faint hopes of a Monaghan revival ended when substitute Ciara O'Sullivan scored a goal with her first touch of the game. Five minutes from the end, Mulcahy completed her hat-trick of goals when she netted a second penalty. Aside from Mulcahy and O'Sullivan, other notable performers for Cork included Juliet Murphy in midfield who scored 0–3, substitute Rhona Buckley, who scored 0–2 and Briege Corkery who produced a fantastic diving block midway through the second half to prevent a Monaghan goal.

Match info

Teams

References

!
All-Ireland Senior Ladies' Football Championship Finals
All-Ireland
Cork county ladies' football team matches
Monaghan county ladies' football team matches